My Pet Warehouse is an Australian retailer of pet supplies. It was founded in 2009 by Philip Bartholomew and it operates from thirteen locations. The company offers a variety of specialty pet supplies and accessories. As of 2015, it is the largest online retailer of pet supplies in Australia with $33 million annual revenue.

History
As a former CEO of Petbarn, Philip Bartholomew launched the multichannel pet store in early 2009. Bartholomew founded The Pet Warehouse, which merged with Petbarn in 2003 and was later acquired by Mammoth Pet Holdings. He left the company and signed a three-year non-compete clause. As soon as the clause expired, Bartholomew started a new pet supplies company under the name My Pet Warehouse in June 2009. The company began its operations from Melbourne, Australia and soon established ten pet stores in the major Australian cities including Perth, Sydney and Brisbane.

Growth
In 2015, the company sold five of its Melbourne stores to consolidate the funds to open eight new stores strategically located in Sydney, Melbourne and Brisbane to expand its reach.

References

External links
Official Website

Pet stores
Pets in Australia
Retail companies of Australia
2009 establishments in Australia
Retail companies established in 2009